The following lists events that happened during 1939 in the Union of Soviet Socialist Republics.

Incumbents
 General Secretary of the Communist Party of the Soviet Union – Joseph Stalin
 Chairman of the Presidium of the Supreme Soviet of the Soviet Union – Mikhail Kalinin
 Chairman of the Council of People's Commissars of the Soviet Union – Vyacheslav Molotov

Events
 March 10–21 – 18th Congress of the All-Union Communist Party (Bolsheviks)
 May 11 – September 16 – Battles of Khalkhin Gol
 August 19 – German–Soviet Credit Agreement (1939)
 August 23 – Molotov–Ribbentrop Pact
 September 17-October 6 – Soviet invasion of Poland
 September 28 – Soviet–Estonian Mutual Assistance Treaty, also amendment to the German–Soviet Frontier Treaty
 October 5 – Soviet–Latvian Mutual Assistance Treaty
 October 10 – Soviet–Lithuanian Mutual Assistance Treaty
 November 26 – Shelling of Mainila

Births
 May 19 – Kateryna Boloshkevich, Ukrainian weaver and statesperson (d. 2018)
 August 16 – Valery Ryumin, Soviet cosmonaut (d. 2022)
 September 7 – Stanislav Petrov, Soviet Air Defence Forces official

Deaths
 February 2 – Vladimir Shukhov, 

 February 22 – Grigory Khakhanyan, corps commander.
 February 23
 Pyotr Smirnov, naval officer and politician.
 Alexander Ilyich Yegorov, army officer.
 February 26
 Stanislav Kosior, politician.
 Vlas Chubar, politician.
 Pavel Postyshev, politician.
 Ivan Fedko, army officer.
 March 3 – Georgy Bazilevich, corps commander.
 March 7 – Matvei Berman, security officer.
 March 10 – Georgy Bondar, corps commander.
 April 1 – Anton Makarenko, educator and writer.
 May 19 – Karl Radek, politician.
 May 21 – Grigori Sokolnikov, economist and politician.
 September 11 – Konstantin Korovin, painter.
 September 17 – Vladimir Menshov, actor and film director (d. 2021)

See also
 1939 in fine arts of the Soviet Union
 List of Soviet films of 1939

 
1930s in the Soviet Union
Years in the Soviet Union
Soviet Union
Soviet Union
Soviet Union